Annual wine festivals celebrate viticulture and usually occur after the harvest of the grapes which, in the northern hemisphere, generally falls at the end of September and runs until well into October or later. They are common in most wine regions around the world and are to be considered in the tradition of other harvest festivals.

The Egyptian god Osiris was dedicated to wine, but the oldest historically documented wine festivals can be traced back to the Greek celebrations for their wine god Dionysos. The typical ingredients of a wine festival include wine drinking, grape pressing, regional foods, music and, in many areas, religious ritual.

In culture

The grape, and the extraction of its juice to produce wine, is more than a flavorsome food or drink. Both grapes and wine have immense cultural significance in many cultures, and often religious significance too.

Competitions

 Oregon Wine Competition
Concours Mondial de Bruxelles
International Wine and Spirit Competition
Varsity blind wine tasting match

Festivals

Australian festivals
Caxton Street Seafood and Wine Festival
Grampians Grape Escape
Kings Cross Food and Wine Festival
Melbourne Food and Wine Festival

Brazilian festivals
 Festa do Vinho (Santa Catarina)
 Festa do Vinho de Andradas

Canadian festivals
Cowichan Wine and Culinary Festival, British Columbia
Niagara Wine Festival, St. Catharines, Ontario

German festivals 
Baden
Wine festival calendar
Hessische Bergstraße
Winzerfest, Groß-Umstadt
Mosel
Moselfest, Winningen
Weinfest der Mittelmosel, Bernkastel-Kues
Palatinate
Burg- und Weinfest, Wachenheim
Deidesheimer Weinkerwe, Deidesheim
Deutsches Weinlesefest, Neustadt
Dürkheimer Wurstmarkt, Bad Dürkheim
Eselshautfest, Mußbach
Fest des Federweißen, Landau
Kändelgassenfest, Großkarlbach
Mandelblütenfest, Gimmeldingen
Stadtmauerfest, Freinsheim
Rheingau
Rheingauer Weinwoche, Wiesbaden
Rheinhessen
Weinmarkt Mainz, Mainz
Backfischfest, Worms
Saxony
Herbst- und Weinfest, Radebeul
Württemberg
Fellbacher Herbst, Fellbach
Weindorf, Stuttgart

French festivals 
 Beaujolais Nouveau
Bordeaux Wine Festival, Bordeaux, France
la paulee de mersault, Burgundy, France

Hungarian festivals

Badacsony Wine Weeks, Badacsonytomaj
Balatonboglár Grape Harvest Days, Balatonboglár
Balatonfüred Wine Weeks, Balatonfüred
BorZsongás, wine festival of Villány
Budapest International Wine Festival, Budapest - the largest Hungarian wine festival (about 50,000 people per festival) 
Budavári Borfesztivál, Budapest
Eger Grape Harvest Festival, Eger
Eger Star Wine Festival (Egri Csillag Borfesztivál), Eger
Etyek Cellar Festival, Etyek
Gourmet Festival, Budapest
Grape Harvest Festival of Tokaj-Hegyalja, Tokaj
Győr Wine Days, Győr
Pannonhalma Wine Region Cellar Festival, Pannonhalma
Rosé Riesling and Jazz Days, Veszprém
Sopron Grape Harvest Days, Sopron
Szekszárd Grape Harvest Festival, Szekszárd
Tihany Grape Harvest Days, Tihany
Tokaj Wine Festival, Tokaj
Villány Grape Harvest Festival, Villány
VinAgora, Budapest
Wine Festival of Balaton's wines, Budapest

United States festivals

 Beaujolais Wine Festival,  Dallas, Texas
Boston Wine Festival, Massachusetts
Cleveland Wine festival, Cleveland, Ohio
Food Network South Beach Wine and Food Festival, Miami Beach, Florida
French Quarter Wine Festival, New Orleans, Louisiana
 Hilton Head Island Wine and Food Festival, one of the oldest in the US
Keystone Wine and Jazz Festival, Keystone, Colorado
Maryland Wine Festival, Maryland
Naples Grape Festival, Naples, New York
North Carolina Wine Festival 
Paso Robles Wine Festival, California
San Diego Bay Wine & Food Festival, California
Simply Wine Festival, California
Oregon Wine Experience, Oregon
Tallahassee Wine and Food Festival, Florida
Temecula Valley Balloon & Wine Festival, California
Vendemmia Festival Philadelphia, Philadelphia, Pennsylvania
Vendemmia Festival Societa' DaVinci, Wilmington, Delaware

Argentinian festivals
Fiesta Nacional de la Vendimia, Mendoza City, Argentina
Médanos, Buenos Aires, Argentina

Other festivals
Feria Nacional de San Marcos, Aguascalientes, Mexico
Festival of Wine, United Kingdom
Haro Wine Festival, Haro, Spain
Port Wine Fest, Vila Nova de Gaia, Portugal
Qormi Wine Festival, Malta
Vendemmia Festival Sicily, Sicily, Italy
Vineyard Harvest of Surco, Santiago de Surco, Peru
Wine Festival of Cyprus, Limassol, Republic of Cyprus
Zielona Góra Wine Fest, Poland

See also
Bacchanalia
History of French wine
Italian wine

References

External links
List of Balkan wine festivals

Wine-related events
 
Wine-producing regions
 W
Fruit festivals
Food and drink festivals